Stylonema alsidii is a species of marine red algae. The type locality is Trieste in Italy, but it has a worldwide distribution.

The species was first described by Giovanni Zanardini in 1840 as Bangia alsidii.

Distribution
It is one of the algae of the Houtman Abrolhos, found off the coast of Western Australia.  It is one of the red seaweeds of South Africa, including the seaweeds of the Cape Peninsula and False Bay.

Ecology
It is susceptible to infection by the parasitic oomycete Pythium porphyrae.

References

External links
 
 
 Stylonema alsidii at AlgaeBase

Stylonematophyceae
Species described in 1840